Davy Crockett  is a 1910 American silent Western film starring Hobart Bosworth as Davy Crockett, with Betty Harte and Tom Santschi. The film was directed by Francis Boggs and distributed by Selig Polyscope Co. It was commercially released in the United States. With a storyline similar to the 1909 Davy Crockett – In Hearts United, this fictional account of Crockett's life has him rescuing his lady love from marrying his rival. The movie ends with Crockett and his girlfriend riding off together.

See also
 List of American films of 1910

References

External links
 
 

1910 films
1910 Western (genre) films
American silent short films
American black-and-white films
Cultural depictions of Davy Crockett
Silent American Western (genre) films
1910s American films
1910s English-language films